Matías Humberto Rojas (born 9 May 1989) was an Argentinian–born Chilean footballer who played as a forward.

He debuted with Ñublense in 2008.

References
 
 

1989 births
Living people
Argentine footballers
Association football forwards
Argentine expatriate footballers
Naval de Talcahuano footballers
Ñublense footballers
Expatriate footballers in Chile
Footballers from Buenos Aires